Toktarovo (Tuqtar) is a rural locality (a village) in Tynbayevsky Selsoviet, Mishkinsky District, Bashkortostan, Russia. The population was 162 as of 2010. There are 5 streets.

Geography 
Toktarovo is located 53 km northwest of Mishkino (the district's administrative centre) by road. Izimarino is the nearest rural locality.

References 

Rural localities in Mishkinsky District